Leonard Talmy is an emeritus professor of linguistics and philosophy at the University at Buffalo in New York. He is known for his pioneering work in cognitive linguistics, more specifically, in the relationship between semantic and formal linguistic structures and the connections between semantic typologies and universals. He is also specialized in the study of Yiddish and Native American linguistics.

See also
 Force Dynamics
 Figure-Ground
 Cognitive Linguistics

Books
 Toward a Cognitive Semantics (2000) -- two volumes
 The Targeting System of Language (The MIT Press, January 2018)

Published Articles
 "The Relation of Grammar to Cognition"
 "Force Dynamics in Language and Cognition"
 "How Language Structures Space"
 "Fictive Motion in Language and `Ception'"
 "Lexicalization Patterns"
 "The Representation of Spatial Structure in Spoken and Signed Languages: a Neural Model"
 "Recombinance in the Evolution of Language"

External links
 
 https://www.acsu.buffalo.edu/~talmy/talmy.html

Linguists from the United States
Linguists of Yiddish
University at Buffalo alumni
Living people
Fellows of the Cognitive Science Society
Year of birth missing (living people)